Cléber Américo da Conceição (born 26 July 1969), known as just Cléber, is a Brazilian former footballer who played as a defender.

Career
Born in Belo Horizonte, Minas Gerais, Cléber began playing football with Atlético Mineiro. He would play for Palmeiras, Cruzeiro and Figueirense in the Campeonato Brasileiro. Cléber also had a spell in La Liga with CD Logroñés from 1991 to 1993.

Honours
Palmeiras
Brazilian Série A: 1993, 1994
Rio-São Paulo Tournament: 1993
São Paulo State Championship: 1993, 1994, 1996
Brazilian Cup: 1998
Mercosur Cup: 1998
Copa Libertadores: 1999
Cruzeiro
Brazilian Cup: 2000
South-Minas Cup: 2001
Figueirense
Santa Catarina State Championship: 2004

References

External links
 

1969 births
Living people
Brazilian footballers
1991 Copa América players
Association football defenders
Clube Atlético Mineiro players
Sociedade Esportiva Palmeiras players
Cruzeiro Esporte Clube players
Santos FC players
Figueirense FC players
Associação Desportiva São Caetano players
CD Logroñés footballers
Copa Libertadores-winning players
Brazil international footballers
Footballers from Belo Horizonte